Frameworks are available to create WebGL content quickly and easily without building from the ground up.

Note: The following list mixes WebGL libraries with game engines as well as cloud services without any distinctions.

See also 
 WebGL
 List of game engines

References 

3D graphics APIs
Cross-platform software
Graphics libraries
Web development